The interleukin-18 receptor (IL-18R) is an interleukin receptor of the immunoglobulin superfamily. 

Endometrial IL-18 receptor mRNA and the ratio of IL-18 binding protein to interleukin 18 are significantly increased in adenomyosis patients in comparison to normal people, indicating a role in its pathogenesis.

References

External links
 

Clusters of differentiation
Immunoglobulin superfamily cytokine receptors